Shepard Stone (March 31, 1908 – May 4, 1990) was an American journalist and foundation administrator.

Stone joined the New York Times in 1933, but in 1942 joined the U.S. army and was active in wartime intelligence work.  He served in Military Government in 1945, establishing a press in the American Occupation Zone in Germany.

He rejoined the Times in 1946, but in 1949 returned to Germany, having been recruited as Assistant Director of Public Affairs for Occupied Germany by the newly appointed High Commissioner John J. McCloy.  He was subsequently promoted to Director.

On McCloy's departure, Stone returned to the States as Director of International Affairs at the Ford Foundation, serving from 1952 to 1967, during which time he worked closely with the CIA in funding cultural projects around the world. He also initiated repeatedly support for the Free University in Berlin.

From 1967 to 1974, he was President of the International Association For Cultural Freedom.

In 1974, Stone went again to Berlin in a role as first director of Aspen in Berlin, a partner institute to American non-profit organization, the Aspen Institute.  He remained there until retirement in 1988.

He was a participant in many of the Bilderberg and Pugwash conferences. He was a member of the Steering Committee of the Bilderberg Group.

References

External links
 The Papers of Shepard Stone at Dartmouth College Library

1908 births
1990 deaths
American male journalists
20th-century American journalists
Members of the Steering Committee of the Bilderberg Group
20th-century American non-fiction writers
20th-century American male writers
Congress for Cultural Freedom